Frommeella tormentillae is a species of rust fungus in the family Phragmidiaceae. It is a  plant pathogen affecting the strawberry.

See also
 List of strawberry diseases

References

Fungal strawberry diseases
Pucciniales
Fungi described in 1870